Albert Joseph, Count Goblet d'Alviella (26 May 1790 – 5 May 1873) was an officer in the army of the United Kingdom of the Netherlands. After the Belgian Revolution, he became a politician and served as the prime minister of Belgium.

Career 
Born in Tournai, Goblet attended the École spéciale militaire de Saint-Cyr. He became an engineer officer in the French Imperial Army, but joined the Royal Netherlands Army in 1815, rising to the rank of captain.

At the moment of the Belgian insurrection on 16 November 1830, he joined the revolutionary forces, and was given the rank of colonel by the provisional government. He went into politics in the newly independent Belgium, where he became Minister for Foreign Affairs (de facto prime minister) between 1832 and 1834. Though no formal party structures existed at the time, he was considered politically Liberal. He was appointed as inspector-general of the Belgian Army in 1834.

In 1837, he was promoted to the rank of lieutenant general and raised to nobility. He was the grandfather of Eugene Goblet d'Alviella, a famous historian.

He died in Brussels aged 82 in 1873.

See also 
 Eugène Goblet d'Alviella
 Félix Goblet d'Alviella
 List of defence ministers of Belgium

References 
 
 Juste, Th., Les fondateurs de la monarchie belge. Le lieutenant général comte Goblet d'Alviella, ministre d'Etat. D'après des documents inédits. 1790–1869, Brussel, 1870
 Juste, Théodore, Le lieutenant-général Comte Goblet d'Alviella 1790–1869, Bruxelles, C. Muquardt, 1870, 146 p

External links 
 Famous Belgians – Prime Ministers and other Politicians
 Count Albert Joseph Goblet d'Alviella

1790 births
1873 deaths
École Spéciale Militaire de Saint-Cyr alumni
Belgian Ministers of State
Prime Ministers of Belgium
Albert Joseph
Knights Fourth Class of the Military Order of William
Liberal Party (Belgium) politicians
People from Tournai
Belgian Ministers of Defence